The 2012 gubernatorial election in the Mexican state of Tabasco we held on Sunday, July 1, 2012. Incumbent Tabasco Governor Andrés Granier Melo of the Institutional Revolutionary Party (PRI) is retiring due to mandatory term limits, which limit all Mexican state governors to one, six-year term in office. The Tabasco gubernatorial election coincided with the 2012 Mexican presidential and general elections.

Candidates

References

2012 elections in Mexico
Tabasco
Gubernatorial
Politics of Tabasco
July 2012 events in Mexico